Nesotragus  is a genus of dwarf antelope comprising two species, endemic to Africa, and formerly but incorrectly considered a synonym of the similarly named genus Neotragus. Recent nucleic acid studies demonstrate that the two species of Nesotragus are not closely related to the genus Neotragus. Members of the Nesotragus are the only members of the subfamily Nesotraginae or tribe Nesotragini and are more closely related to the impala, while the royal antelope remains a member of the subfamily Antilopinae or tribe Antilopini. The scientific name comes from Greek νῆσος (nêsos), "island", and τράγος (trágos), "he-goat", apparently in reference to the antelope species' habitat in wet rainforests.

References

Dwarf antelopes
Mammal genera